The 1894 Nebraska Bugeaters football team represented the University of Nebraska in the 1894 college football season. The team was coached by second-year head coach Frank Crawford and played their home games at the "M" Street Park in Lincoln, Nebraska. They competed as members of the Western Interstate University Football Association.

For the first time in program history, Nebraska started the season with a returning head coach. Crawford left after the season to become the head football coach at Texas. NU played a pre-season exhibition game against Lincoln High.

Schedule

Coaching staff

Roster

Game summaries

Lincoln High

For the first time, Nebraska played an exhibition game prior to the regular season. Results and statistics from this game did not count toward the season.

Grinnell

Grinnell had won four of the previous five Iowa state championships prior to their first game against Nebraska. A hard-fought first half ended scoreless, but the underdog Bugeaters used three second-half touchdowns by George Flippin to pull away.

Doane

Doane scored once in each half to upset the Bugeaters.

at Missouri

Nebraska's first conference game in 1894 was a trip to Missouri. The Tigers won 18–14.

at Omaha YMCA

Nebraska's first-ever football game was a tightly contested game against the Omaha YMCA, but by 1894 the Bugeaters outmatched the YMCA's team of high school students and other Omaha residents. Nebraska led 30–0 lead at halftime, and won the game 36–6.

at Kansas

An officiating dispute delayed kickoff, but once underway Kansas took an early 6–0 lead. The Bugeaters pulled ahead 8–6 by halftime and kept the Jayhawks off the scoreboard in the second half to win for the first time against Kansas.

University of Kansas records suggest this game was played on November 22, 1894 in Lincoln.

at Ottawa

Though the game was planned just one week ahead of time, efforts were made to publicize the match, drawing over 400 locals from the area to watch. Nebraska padded its roster in preparation, adding head coach Frank Crawford as a quarterback and another (unnamed) football coach as a fullback. Nebraska's first half touchdown was the only scoring of the day. This was the only game ever played between Nebraska and Ottawa.

Iowa

Nebraska's final conference game was a trip to Omaha to meet Iowa. Nebraska, led by future Utah governor and United States Secretary of War George Dern, dominated the game en route to a 36–0 win. The win gave Nebraska a share of its first conference championship.

University of Iowa records suggest the final score of this game was a 14–12 Nebraska victory.

at Omaha YMCA

After a dominating Nebraska victory just weeks prior, the Omaha YMCA nearly upset the Bugeaters in a Christmas Day rematch. The YMCA led 6–0 at halftime but Nebraska answered with 10 points in the second half to win.

References

Nebraska
Nebraska Cornhuskers football seasons
Nebraska Bugeaters football